Wilhelm "Wilhelmi" Malmivaara (until 1900 Malmberg; 13 February 1854 – 12 January 1922) was one of the leaders of Finnish Awakening in the beginning of the 20th century. He was a member of the synod of the Evangelical Lutheran Church of Finland in 1898, 1908, 1913 and 1918 and was also a representative of the clergy in the pre-independence Diet of Finland in 1897, 1899, 1900 and 1904–05 and a member of the Parliament of Finland, representing  the Finnish Party from 1907 to 1918 and the National Coalition Party from 1918 to 1920.

Malmivaara was born in Lapua, the son of Finnish Awakening movement leader Nils Gustav Malmberg and Helena Jaakontytär Huhtala. He worked together with Mauno Rosendal and Juho Malkamäki as a leader of the awakening movement and as a vicar (leading pastor) of Lapua parish in 1900-1922. Before that he was an assistant pastor in Kiuruvesi (1879–92) and vicar of Paavola (1892–1900). Malmivaara and Malkamäki's work resulted in awakenings in many places in southern Ostrobothnia and the movement entered a new revival period. In 1914 the first folk high school associated with the Awakening started at Karhunmäki in Lapua.
 
Malmivaara is a notable Finnish hymnwriter who renewed the hymnal of Finnish Awakening Siionin virret, which was translated in entirety into singable English verse in 2014 by Thomas McElwain. Seven of his texts are included in the hymnal and three of his texts are used in the hymnal of the Evangelical Lutheran Church of Finland. He also carried out the renewal of the hymnal originally composed by Finnish pastor and revivalist preacher Antti Achrenius. In 1888 Malmivaara founded the periodical of the Finnish Awakening, Hengellinen Kuukauslehti.

As a preacher, Malmivaara was equal to his father and had a particular capability to touch the hearts of his listeners. His sermons were published posthumously in a two-volume collection, Viestejä vaivatuille (1927–33), which remains one of the most remarkable achievements in Finland in the field of published sermon literature.

On the question of alcohol Malmivaara was an absolute prohibitionist and introduced that position into Finnish Awakening.

Malmivaara married Karin Rajander. The couple had many children, and several of their sons became pastors. Malmivaara died in Lapua, and his descendants are still represented in the Finnish clergy.

Main works
 Kaita tie Joonaan kirjan valossa (1900)
 Puolivuosisataa heränneiden keskuudessa (1914)
 Elämän ääni (1954)

Further reading
 A. Oravala: Wilhelmi Malmivaara, Elämä ja elämäntyö (1929, 2. ed. 1930)
 O. Tiililä: Suomalainen kristillisyys Wilhelmi Malmivaaran edustamana (1944)
 Articles by J. Sinnemäki and V. Kuoppala in Kytösavut I and II (1945 and 1946)

1854 births
1922 deaths
People from Lapua
People from Vaasa Province (Grand Duchy of Finland)
20th-century Finnish Lutheran clergy
Finnish Party politicians
National Coalition Party politicians
Members of the Diet of Finland
Members of the Parliament of Finland (1907–08)
Members of the Parliament of Finland (1908–09)
Members of the Parliament of Finland (1909–10)
Members of the Parliament of Finland (1910–11)
Members of the Parliament of Finland (1911–13)
Members of the Parliament of Finland (1913–16)
Members of the Parliament of Finland (1916–17)
Members of the Parliament of Finland (1917–19)
Members of the Parliament of Finland (1919–22)
People of the Finnish Civil War (White side)
Finnish Lutheran hymnwriters
University of Helsinki alumni
Finnish Awakening
19th-century Finnish Lutheran clergy